The municipalities of Algeria (Arabic: بلدية (singular)) form the third level of administrative subdivisions of Algeria. As of 2002, there were 1,541 municipalities in the country.

List
This list is a copy from the Statoids page named Municipalities of Algeria. The population data is from June 25, 1998.

References

See also
 List of cities in Algeria
 Cities of present-day nations and states

 
Subdivisions of Algeria
Algeria 3
Communes, Algeria
Communes